Grays Consolidated High School was a historic high school located at Grays, Jasper County, South Carolina. It was built in 1927 and rebuilt in 1931. It consisted of three projecting pavilions, with the central pavilion featuring decorative rafter tails, knee braces, and a two-part limestone inlaid plaque. Flanking this were projecting pavilions with hipped roofs. In 1931, the building was expanded with a large classroom wing extension and rear ell. Also on the property is a contributing outbuilding - a brick boiler room/storage room.

The building was added to the National Register of Historic Places in 2007. The school was demolished in March 2013, and was removed from the National Register in 2016.

References 

School buildings on the National Register of Historic Places in South Carolina
School buildings completed in 1931
Buildings and structures in Jasper County, South Carolina
National Register of Historic Places in Jasper County, South Carolina
Former National Register of Historic Places in South Carolina
Demolished buildings and structures in South Carolina
Buildings and structures demolished in 2013